Ardeshir or Ardashir (Persian: اردشیر; also spelled as Ardasher) is a Persian name popular in Iran and other Persian-speaking countries. Ardashir is the New Persian form of the Middle Persian name , which is ultimately from Old Iranian *Artaxšaθra-, equivalent to Greek Artaxérxēs, and Armenian Artašēs. Literally, Ardashir means "the one whose reign is based on honesty and justice". The first part of *Artaxšaθra- is adapted from the religious concept of justice known as Ṛta or Asha and the second part is related to the concept "city".

Throne name of several rulers
 Artaxerxes (disambiguation), the Hellenized form of Ardeshir
 Ardashir Orontid, r. 5th century BC, Armenian King from the Orontid Dynasty
 Ardashir I, r. 224–241, founder of the Sassanid Empire
 Ardashir II, r. 379–383, son of Hormizd II and successor of Shapur II "the Great"
 Ardashir III, r. 628–630, the youngest of the Sassanid kings
 Ardashir I (Bavandid ruler) (Ardashir I of Mazandaran), r. 1173–1205, ruler of the Bavand dynasty
 Ardashir II (Bavandid ruler) (Ardashir II of Mazandaran), r. 1238–1249, ruler of the Bavand dynasty

Given name
 Ardaseer Cursetjee (1808–1877), the first Indian elected a Fellow of the Royal Society 
 Ardeshir Godrej (1868–1936), Indian inventor and engineer
 Ardeshir Irani (1886–1969), Indian screenwriter and director 
 Ardeshir Furdorji Sohrabji (1897–1990), Indian cricket commentator
 Ardeshir Tarapore (1923–1965), Indian soldier, Param vir chakra recipient
 Ardeshir Cowasjee (1926–2012), Pakistani journalist
 Ardeshir Zahedi (1928–2021), Iranian diplomat
 Ardeshir Mohasses (1938–2008), Iranian illustrator
 Ardeshir Hosseinpour (1962–2007), Iranian scientist
 Ardeshir Kamkar (born 1962), Iranian musician

Other
 Ardeshir, Iran, a village in East Azerbaijan Province
 Mons Ardeshir, a mountain on the Moon

See also
 Artaxerxes (disambiguation)
 Artaxias (disambiguation)
 Asha, a Zoroastrian concept

References